NASA Sustainability Base is a building at the Ames Research Center in Mountain View, California that was designed to exhibit and test the latest energy-saving technologies as part of the federal government's drive to eliminate fossil-fuel consumption in all new government buildings by 2030. The building was not initially conceived as a "sustainability base", but associate director Steven Zornestzer worked with architect William McDonough to create an energy-efficient building for the 21st century.  Energy-saving features include water recycling, fuel cell electricity generation, natural lighting, solar panels, and a geothermal well system.  Also, the building had normal budget and actually a shorter than normal production time.

References

External links
NASA Sustainability Base
NASA's First Space Station on Earth: A Look Inside the Sustainability Base

Ames Research Center
Buildings and structures in Santa Clara County, California
Sustainable buildings in the United States